The black-faced dacnis (Dacnis lineata) is a species of bird in the family Thraupidae. It is commonly found typically in pairs in humid forests in the Amazon and the Chocó-Magdalena. The latter population has a yellow (not white) belly and is sometimes considered a separate species, the yellow-tufted dacnis (D. egregia).

Description 
Male is mostly cerulean blue with a black mask and upperparts. Also note piercing yellow eye. "Yellow-tufted" form has bright yellow belly and conspicuous yellow tufts under shoulders. Female is much duller than male: yellowish below with gray head, olive back, and a hint of a dark mask.

References

Dacnis
Taxonomy articles created by Polbot
Birds described in 1789
Taxa named by Johann Friedrich Gmelin